Rupali Ramdas Repale (born 3 February 1982 in Mumbai), is an Indian open-water long-distance swimmer and triathlete. She swam the English Channel in the solo swim category on 15 August 1994  in a time span of 16 hours and 7 minutes, making her the youngest successful swimmer (12 years old) to cross the English Channel for the year 1994. She swam a total of seven straits during the course of her swimming career, Gibraltar Strait, Palk Strait, Bass Strait, Cook Strait, Robben Island Channel and Mumbai-Dharamtar Channel.

Early life and background
Rupali Repale was born in Mumbai, the daughter of Ramdas Repale and Rekha Repale, who were small-scale business owners from a modest financial background. Born in rural Pune, both the parents moved to Mumbai city in 1970s shortly before their marriage and settled in Bhandup, a suburb of Mumbai. Rupali completed her schooling at Bright High School & Junior College Bhandup-(west) and went on to graduate with a degree in sociology from Mumbai University.
Rupali started swimming at an early age and soon developed a penchant for it. She showed remarkable stamina even at an early age and could swim for hours at a stretch. Noticed by her coaches and later backed by her father, she soon started training for long-distance events and later in the open waters. Apart from swimming, she also participates in Triathlon events and has achieved many accolades in it as well.

Swimming career
 1994: English Channel, England to France, 34 kilometers in 16 hours and 7 minutes. Youngest Swimmer for the year 1994.
 1994: Gibraltar Strait, Spain to Morocco, 28 kilometers in 5 hours and 5 minutes.
 1995: Mumbai to Dharamtar two-way Gateway of India swim, 72 kilometers in 21 hours and 30 minutes.
 1995: Sri Lanka to India, 40 kilometers in 11 hours and 5 minutes.
 1996: Bass Strait, Phillip Bay to Melbourne, 65 kilometers in 17 hours, required swimming within the confines of a cage due to the shark-infested nature of the strait.
 1998: Cook Strait, Pegano Head to Waipiro Bay (New Zealand), 80 kilometers in 19 hours 44 minutes, record for the longest successful swim in first attempt
 2000: Three Anchor Bay to Robben Island (South Africa) two-way. 30 kilometers in 7 hrs.

Awards and honors
 National Youth Award awarded by then President of India late Hon. Shankar Dayal Sharma, Bhopal 1995.
 Tenzing Norgay National Adventure Award awarded by then Minister of Youth Affairs and Sports (India) Hon. Uma Bharti, New Delhi 1999.
 HIMA Foundation Award awarded by then Governor of Maharashtra late Hon. Dr. P C Alexander, Mumbai 1995.
 Sagar Kanya title conferred upon by the Government of Maharashtra.
 Dolphin Queen title conferred upon by the Government of New Zealand.

Present activities
Rupali is the founder and director of Rupali Industries, a water purification based home appliance company. In her spare time she likes to coach young talent at local swimming pools.

Books on Rupali
 Biographical book Jal Akramile (Marathi) written by Sumedh Vadavala and published by Rajhans Prakashans.
 Excerpt from Rupali's book is included in the Maharashtra state school curriculum to encourage youth involvement in sports.

References

External links

Official Site
Junnar Taluka

1982 births
Living people
Indian female swimmers
English Channel swimmers
Strait of Gibraltar
Palk Strait
Recipients of the Tenzing Norgay National Adventure Award
Female long-distance swimmers
Athletes from Mumbai
Sportswomen from Maharashtra
20th-century Indian women
20th-century Indian people
Swimmers from Mumbai